A Dangerous Toy (originally titled Il giocattolo) is a 1979 Italian crime drama film written and directed by Giuliano Montaldo.  It was co-produced by Sergio Leone. The toy of the title is a gun. The film chronicles how a frustrated and shy accountant may become a cruel and ruthless executioner. For his role in this film Vittorio Mezzogiorno won the Silver Ribbon for Best Supporting Actor.

Plot 
The accountant Vittorio Barletta lives in Milan with his wife Ada. A friend since childhood of the industrialist Nicola Griffo, Vittorio serves him as a security carrier and as a cover for "black funds". Wounded in the course of a robbery at a supermarket, Barletta is replaced by a more aggressive former carabinieri marshal for the tasks of security guard of the Griffo. In the meantime, having made acquaintance and friendship with the agent Sauro Civera, Vittorio finds out of having a talent for pistol shooting and becomes so expert as to win shooting competitions. Robbed of his newly acquired weapon, the accountant receives a pistol as a gift from Sauro. Having gone with his policeman friend to a pizzeria, the latter recognizes a convict who reacts by killing him, but Vittorio too, after a few moments of perplexity, shoots and kills the bandit. The TV and the press cover the hero but the noise doesn't last long and doesn't bring in money. Ada is seriously ill. Vittorio is teased by Nicola, by his wife, Laura, and by the reckless daughter of the Griffos, Patrizia. Meanwhile, threats of evil are multiplying, communicated by telephone or through anonymous letters. During an ambush he shots and wounds the attackers then he spends a few days in jail. Abandoned by Nicola, who fires him after making him sign the sale of a phantom company, the accountant locks himself up in the house with the increasingly weak Ada. Then, when he can't take it anymore, Vittorio decides to humiliate the Griffos, but his dying wife is determined to stop him.

Cast 
Nino Manfredi: Vittorio Barletta
Marlène Jobert: Ada Barletta
Arnoldo Foà: Nicola Griffo
Vittorio Mezzogiorno: Sauro Civera
Olga Karlatos: Laura Griffo
Pamela Villoresi: Patrizia Griffo
Mario Brega: the robber
Luciano Catenacci: Griffo's bodyguard
Renato Scarpa: the gunsmith
Daniele Formica: Gualtiero
Arnaldo Ninchi: TV interviewer

References

External links

1979 films
1970s crime thriller films
1970s action thriller films
Italian vigilante films
1970s Italian-language films
Films directed by Giuliano Montaldo
1979 crime drama films
Films scored by Ennio Morricone
Films set in Milan
Films with screenplays by Sergio Donati
1970s vigilante films
1970s crime action films
1970s Italian films